The Shift key  is a modifier key on a keyboard, used to type capital letters and other alternate "upper" characters. There are typically two shift keys, on the left and right sides of the row below the home row. The Shift key's name originated from the typewriter, where one had to press and hold the button to shift up the case stamp to change to capital letters;
the shift key was first used in the Remington No. 2 Type-Writer of 1878; the No. 1 model was capital-only.

On the US layout and similar keyboard layouts, characters that typically require the use of the shift key include the parentheses, the question mark, the exclamation point, and the colon.

When the caps lock key is engaged, the shift key may be used to type lowercase letters on many operating systems, though not on macOS.

Labeling

The keyboard symbol for the Shift key (which is called Level 2 Select key in the international standard series ISO/IEC 9995) is given in ISO/IEC 9995-7 as symbol 1, and in ISO 7000 “Graphical symbols for use on equipment” as a directional variant of the symbol ISO-7000-251. In Unicode 6.1, the character approximating this symbol best is U+21E7  (⇧). This symbol is commonly used to denote the Shift key on modern keyboards (especially on non-US layouts and on the Apple Keyboard), sometimes in combination with the word “shift” or its translation in the local language. This symbol also is used in texts to denote the shift key.

Uses on computer keyboards
On computer keyboards, as opposed to typewriter keyboards, the shift key can have many more uses:

 It is sometimes used to modify the function keys. Modern Microsoft Windows keyboards typically have only 12 function keys; Shift+F1 must be used to type F13, Shift+F2 for F14, etc.
 It can modify various control and alt keys. For example, if Alt-Tab is used to cycle through open windows, Shift-Alt-Tab cycles in the reverse order, and using Ctrl-Shift-S could open a "Save as…" dialogue allowing to choose a new file name and directory instead of overwriting the current file.
 In most graphical systems using a mouse and keyboard, the shift key can be used to select a range. For example, if a file is selected in a list, shift-clicking on a file further down the list will select the files clicked on plus the ones inbetween. Similarly, when editing text a shift-click will select the text between the click point and the text cursor.
 The shift key can be used in conjunction with the arrow keys to select text.
 Holding shift while drawing with the mouse in graphics programs generally confines the shape to a straight line, usually vertically or horizontally, or to draw squares and circles using the rectangle and ellipse tools, respectively.
 The shift key can also be used to modify the mouse behavior on a computer. For example, holding shift while clicking on a link in a web browser might cause the page to open in a new window, or to be downloaded.
 In some web browsers, holding shift while scrolling will scan through previously viewed web pages.
 In mostly Pinyin Input Method, Shift key usually use to switch between Chinese and lowercase English.
 In older versions of macOS (10.12 Sierra and below), holding  while performing certain actions, such as minimising a window or enabling/disabling Dashboard or Mission Control, makes the animation occur in slow motion. For some animations, holding  will make the animation move just slightly slower, and holding  will result in an extremely slow motion animation.

On some keyboards, if both shift keys are held down simultaneously only some letters can be typed. For example, on the Dell keyboard Model RT7D20 only 16 letters can be typed. This phenomenon is known as "masking" and is a fundamental limitation of the way the keyboard electronics are designed.

Windows specific
The following is a list of actions involving the shift key for the Microsoft Windows operating system.

See also
 AltGr key
 Command key
 Option key
 StickyKeys

References

Computer keys